The first season of the American streaming television series The Punisher, which is based on the Marvel Comics character of the same name, sees Frank Castle uncover a conspiracy while seeking revenge for the death of his family. It is set in the Marvel Cinematic Universe (MCU), sharing continuity with the films and other television series of the franchise. The season was produced by Marvel Television in association with ABC Studios and Bohemian Risk Productions, with Steve Lightfoot serving as showrunner.

Jon Bernthal stars as Castle, alongside Ebon Moss-Bachrach, Ben Barnes, Amber Rose Revah, Daniel Webber, Paul Schulze, Jason R. Moore, Michael Nathanson, Jaime Ray Newman, and Deborah Ann Woll. Development on The Punisher as a spin-off from Daredevil began by January 2016, and it was ordered to series in April. Lightfoot was announced as executive producer and showrunner, with Bernthal and Woll reprising their roles from Daredevil. Filming took place in New York City from October 2016 to April 2017. Practical effects were augmented by the visual effects department, including the addition of muzzle flashes and gore to fight scenes. The season explores post-traumatic stress disorder for military veterans, and depicts "all sides" of the United States gun control debate.

The season premiered in New York City on November 6, 2017, with the full season of thirteen episodes released on November 17 on Netflix, and received mixed to positive reviews, with Bernthal's performance, action sequences and improvements to its source material from the previous films gaining praise, but criticism towards its pacing and amount of violence. A surprise release had been planned for October, but was cancelled following the 2017 Las Vegas shooting. A second season was ordered in December 2017.

Episodes

Cast and characters

Main
 Jon Bernthal as Frank Castle / Punisher
 Ebon Moss-Bachrach as David Lieberman / Micro
 Ben Barnes as Billy Russo
 Amber Rose Revah as Dinah Madani
 Daniel Webber as Lewis Wilson
 Paul Schulze as William Rawlins
 Jason R. Moore as Curtis Hoyle
 Michael Nathanson as Sam Stein
 Jaime Ray Newman as Sarah Lieberman
 Deborah Ann Woll as Karen Page

Recurring
 Shohreh Aghdashloo as Farah Madani
 Jordan Mahome as Isaac Lange
 Kelli Barrett as Maria Castle
 Aidan Pierce Brennan as Frank Castle Jr.
 Nicolette Pierini as Lisa Castle
 Ripley Sobo as Leo Lieberman
 Kobi Frumer as Zach Lieberman
 Tony Plana as Rafael Hernandez

Notable guests
 Geoffrey Cantor as Mitchell Ellison
 Clancy Brown as Ray Schoonover
 Rob Morgan as Turk Barrett
 Royce Johnson as Brett Mahoney

Production

Development
By January 2016, ahead of the Daredevil season two release, Netflix was in "very early development" on a spin-off series titled The Punisher, and was looking for a showrunner. The series would be centered on Jon Bernthal as Frank Castle, and was described as a stand-alone series apart from those leading up to The Defenders crossover event. That April, Netflix officially ordered a full 13 episode season of The Punisher, confirmed Bernthal's involvement, and named Steve Lightfoot as executive producer and showrunner. Asked whether he would rather have a 10 episode season given the longer 13 episode-seasons have been criticized for other Marvel Netflix series, Lightfoot said that he wanted the season to be a "slow burn show" that was character-driven, and that he felt they had the right amount of story to fill the 13 episodes.

Writing
Lightfoot had a loose idea of what the "journey of Season 1" would be when he joined the series, and this was fleshed-out and altered in the writers room throughout work on the season. Executive producer Jeph Loeb said the season would ask the questions "Who is Frank? What is Frank going to do? And who's going to try and stop Frank?" Lightfoot chose not to adapt any specific version of the character from the comics and instead looked to the work that was done in Daredevil defining the character. That series' depiction was what got Lightfoot interested in the character, and he wanted it to dictate this series' direction. The Punisher begins with a teaser featuring Castle killing the gang members that he believes are responsible for his family's death, which is a conclusion to the character's story in Daredevil. The series then jumps ahead to the character "stuck in the past and sort of crippled by this grief". The season also depicts some events from before the second season of Daredevil, which Bernthal described as being "loose with chronology"; this includes an explanation of Castle's time serving in Kandahar, which had been mentioned in Daredevil and was something that Lightfoot felt this series should address.

As a fan of Westerns and 1970s urban thrillers, Lightfoot felt that the series should combine those ideas due to Castle's antihero persona being an archetype of Western films but set in the urban environment of New York City. Lightfoot looked to films from those genres as inspiration for tone and style, ideas, and themes for the series, and also looked to 1970s conspiracy thriller films due to Castle being a fugitive in the series and the general sense of paranoia. The series makes a reference to Marathon Man (1976), while Lightfoot described the first episode of the series as a modern "updating" of Shane (1953). Lightfoot also took inspiration from the Bourne film series and the film American Sniper (2014) for the series. Regarding his previous television series Hannibal, Lightfoot stated that he learned from that series' creator Bryan Fuller to make an antihero like Hannibal Lecter relatable to the audience by finding "something in them that's universal that we can all feel", such as Lector being lonely. Carrying this over to The Punisher, Lightfoot saw in Castle the idea of "a man whose family was taken from him at a young age" and that a series focused on him should be an exploration of his grief and how he responds to it. Lightfoot felt that even audience members who did not agree with Castle's actions would be able to go on a "journey" with the character if they understood this aspect of him.

Rather than show the "beautiful" scenes of horror that were created for Hannibal, Lightfoot wanted to follow the lead of the character's fight scenes in Daredevil by not shying away from the cost of the actual actions, feeling that showing the brutal reality of Castle's actions would better convey to the audience that "This stuff hurts, and it's not OK" rather than glossing over the violence which he felt would have been worse. He elaborated that he was unsure if the series was the most violent Marvel Netflix series, as he was simply taking the level of violence he saw depicted in Daredevil as a baseline for this series, and that it is important to remember that "a lot of what he's doing is wrong. We have to let the audience lose him at times and let him win them back. To just wholeheartedly be behind him wouldn't be right". Despite this, Lightfoot wanted to convey the character's feelings and thoughts to help the audience understand the character, and often used flashbacks or dreams featuring his family since Castle does not talk much and having constant flashbacks also represented how he is unable to stop thinking about them.

Lightfoot described Castle as a metaphor for "the fact that we’ve been sending men to war for 15 years now and then bringing them back and expecting them to just fit back in. Clearly, that isn't what happens." Having not served in the military himself, Lightfoot spent time with the rest of the series' writers reading first-person accounts and memoirs from real-life war veterans, and the series also had consultants from the military, the Special Forces, and the CIA including one military consultant who read every script of the series and gave notes. Noting that a vocal community of United States soldiers and veterans were fans of the Punisher character, Lightfoot and Bernthal ensured that the series was always respectful of the military and law enforcement despite Castle's actions being generally criminal; Lightfoot said it was an "interesting thing to be respectful of the police and at the same time, the character is beyond the law." Feeling that it was not his place to preach about the politics of vigilantism or the United States gun control debate, Lightfoot wanted to create a "body of characters where you feel like all sides and issues were given a voice so the audience can decide", from a veteran who is a "gentle group-therapy leader" to a "gun nut". When creating an original character for the series to serve as the "tough nemesis cop" who is hunting Castle, Lightfoot decided to "mix the paradigm up" by making the character female and his equal. Lightfoot noted that the writer's room, which included both men and women, had "a lot of fun" with this idea. They also wanted the character to be of Middle Eastern descent and be as big of a patriot as Castle and an action hero in her own right. This character became Dinah Madani. Lightfoot did not want the "spiderweb" of supporting characters in the series to be "sidekicks" to Castle, and instead have "their own narrative and their own story that was the most important thing to them".

Casting
The main cast for the season includes Bernthal as Frank Castle / Punisher, Ebon Moss-Bachrach as David Lieberman / Micro, Ben Barnes as Billy Russo, Amber Rose Revah as Dinah Madani, Daniel Webber as Lewis Wilson, Paul Schulze as William Rawlins, Jason R. Moore as Curtis Hoyle, Michael Nathanson as Sam Stein, Jaime Ray Newman as Sarah Lieberman, and Deborah Ann Woll as Karen Page. Bernthal and Woll both reprise their roles from Daredevil.

In August 2017, Shohreh Aghdashloo was revealed to be portraying Farah Madani, Dinah's mother, in a recurring role for the season. Also recurring in the season are Jordan Mahome as Isaac Lange, Kelli Barrett as Maria Castle, Aidan Pierce Brennan as Frank Castle Jr., Nicolette Pierini as Lisa Castle, Ripley Sobo as Leo Lieberman, Kobi Frumer as Zach Lieberman, and Tony Plana as Rafael Hernandez. Rob Morgan and Royce Johnson reprise their roles from previous Marvel Netflix series as Turk Barrett and Brett Mahoney, respectively. Geoffrey Cantor and Clancy Brown reprise their respective Daredevil roles as Mitchell Ellison and Ray Schoonover.

In addition to several actors portraying war veterans, including Mahome, the series also cast real-life war veterans as extras and supporting cast for scenes such as support group meetings. Mahome, whose father served in the military, found this to be a powerful experience and helpful for his acting in the series.

Design
Stephanie Maslansky, who served as costume designer for the first seasons of Daredevil, Jessica Jones, Luke Cage, and Iron Fist, had the choice between designing for The Defenders or for The Punisher due to a scheduling conflict between the two productions, and chose to work on The Defenders. Instead, Lorraine Calvert designed the costumes for The Punisher after introducing the look of the character in the second season of Daredevil; her take on the character's "beloved" comic-inspired costume balances the original design, Bernthal's needs as an actor and interpretation of the character, and Lightfoot's intentions for the tone of the series.

Filming
Filming began on October 3, 2016 in Brooklyn, New York, under the working title Crime. Locations for the production included Greenpoint, Brooklyn, the Williamsburg Bridge, Columbus Circle and Central Park West, Cortlandt Alley, Circle Line Downtown cruises, the Manhattan Family Court building, Long Island City, Grand Ferry Park in South Williamsburg, Brooklyn, Sunnyside, Queens, Pulaski Bridge, the Roosevelt Island and its steam plant, the Bronx County Courthouse, Newtown Creek, The Roosevelt Hotel, Astoria Park, Tudor City, Hunts Point, Bronx, the Forest Park Carousel, the Bronx–Whitestone Bridge, the "GoodFellas Diner" before it was damaged in a 2018 fire and the Mount Zion Cemetery, both in Maspeth, Queens, and in Astoria, Queens. A car chase for the season was filmed at the Brooklyn Navy Yard in night shoots, with Moss-Bachrach driving one of the cars. Filming for the season wrapped on April 9, 2017.

Visual effects
Visual effects supervisor Greg Anderson and vendor FuseFX returned from the first season of Luke Cage to create the visual effects for The Punisher, creating 855 visual effects shots across the season. Their team changed in size for each episode, but generally consisted of 15 to 20 people. Due to the realistic tone of the series, which does not feature any superpowers, the visual effects department had to work even harder than usual to ensure their effects were believable, with a focus on creating "gunplay, knifeplay, explosions and other real world effects." They preferred to augment practical effects rather than start from scratch to help with realism as well as the series' budget and schedule.

As an example of the work Fuse did during fight sequences, Anderson discussed the scene where Russo and his men attack Micro's basement. Though practical prop weapons were used for the fight, Fuse had to augment the action with computer generated blood, knives, and muzzle flashes, as well as a computer generated head that is blown apart by a shotgun. The sequence was thoroughly storyboarded and pre-visualized to plan out the exact visuals required. Because the scene, like many others throughout the season, required a dark environment the visual effects team had to work with the cinematography department to decide where the low-light should be practical and where color-grading could be used to alter a more brightly-lit set given it is difficult to integrate visual effects with dark images. Conversely to this scene, a sequence such as when Russo blows up a hideout required minimal visual effects work because the explosion was shot practically, with Fuse mainly just adding some windows to the building that were removed for the explosion. 

The most technically difficult scene of the season to create was in the first episode, where Castle shoots someone from across the Mexico–United States border. Anderson estimated that the scene was 90 percent digital, with the environment between Castle and his target created entirely by the visual effects department. So that Moore could portray amputee Curtis Hoyle, Fuse had to digitally replace his leg in several shots. This involved Moore wearing a green sleeve over his leg and Fuse replacing it with a stump. The company also had to recreate the background behind Moore's actual leg which was often the most difficult part, such as when he is getting out of bed and realistic-looking digital cloth needed to match with the actual sheets that were on set. Additionally, visual effects were used to augment cement in the sequence where people are thrown into it. The special effects department created a mixture to look like cement for use while filming the scene, but it ultimately did not look realistic on camera and had to be changed digitally.

Music
In April 2017, Tyler Bates was announced as the composer for The Punisher, after previously composing for Marvel's Guardians of the Galaxy and Guardians of the Galaxy Vol. 2. In order to "get into the dark corners of the Punisher's mind," Bates played "more of a broken blues" guitar, which was augmented with talkbox effects and other "guitar noises", along with guitar-vol and melodica. On this style, Bates said, "The rough edges and broken nature of [music like this] leaves a great deal of space for emotion and interesting color—and a bit of an attitude. Otherwise it's not going to be an authentic expression of the idea. There's a darkness in there that I'm happy to tap into." A soundtrack album for the season was released digitally by Hollywood Records on November 17, 2017 in conjunction with the season's Netflix release. All music composed by Tyler Bates:

Marketing
Bernthal and Woll appeared at New York Comic Con in October 2016 to officially announce the start of production on the series and the latter's involvement, while Bernthal presented exclusive footage from the series at San Diego Comic-Con 2017. A teaser was revealed on Netflix in August 2017 after the credits of the final episode of The Defenders. Also in the month, the series' Twitter account revealed the episode titles as Morse code messages. In September 2017, the series' Instagram account released viral videos made to look like security footage, while episodic photos and a poster for the season with a redacted release date were also released. On September 20, the official trailer for the season was released. Andrew Liptak of The Verge said it "sets up The Punisher with its own distinct tone that's different from the other Marvel Netflix shows. It wades into government conspiracies and hacking, which is reminiscent of shows like CBS's Person of Interest or USA's Mr. Robot, but with more gunfire." Nerdist's Kendall Ashley called the trailer "intense, super bloody, and has [me] INCREDIBLY pumped for the show's premiere." She added that "if this trailer is any indication, The Punisher is definitely going to live up to fan expectations". Ashley felt the inclusion of "One" by Metallica in the trailer "helps paint Frank as a badass unlike any we've seen on the Marvel Netflix shows so far." Cooper Hood, writing for Screen Rant felt the trailer would "only increase the fever for" the series despite it not yet having a release date, with it more closely fitting the "mold" of the character than the more cryptic videos previously released. He also found it "well-cut" to the beat of the song, which he praised as "amplifying the intensity".

By the end of September, Netflix had updated their viral website for the New York Bulletin to include a profile page for Karen Page. After revealing her login credentials in a post on Daredevils Facebook page, readers who visited Page's profile found images referencing Page's research into Castle from the second season of Daredevil. Bernthal and other members of the cast were scheduled to appear at New York Comic Con 2017 to promote the season, but the panel was cancelled after the 2017 Las Vegas Strip shooting. Two weeks later, a second trailer was released revealing the season's release date of November 17, 2017. Tom Philip at GQ was not very enthused with the trailer, saying it was "hard to get super jazzed about another gritty, ultra-violent, gun-loving, non-superhero show right now." He was critical of the "utilitarian-sounding writing" in the trailer, but felt the chemistry between Bernthal and Woll would be a reason to watch the series. Philip also felt the addition of Moss-Bachrach was "curious", and said "at least [the series is] a swing for the fences from a TV studio that tends to play it astoundingly safe." Scott Mendelson of Forbes noted that the gun violence sequences featured were mainly "flashbacks with military men doing military things in full fatigues or scenes of bad guys shooting at not-so-bad guys with heavy gunfire", which was a strong contrast to the first trailer. Mendelson felt this shift in the marketing strategy could have been in response to the Las Vegas shooting. TechCrunch's Darrell Etherington agreed with Mendelson, noting how the trailer "plays up Castle's motivations and the more human side of the story", while still looking "gritty and dark, [and] Bernthal's portrayal looking as strong as ever." Etherington also criticized the soundtrack of the trailer. The Punisher had its red carpet premiere on November 6, 2017, in New York City at the 34th Street AMC Loews theatre.

Release
The first season of The Punisher was released on November 17, 2017 on the streaming service Netflix, worldwide. In July 2016, Netflix COO Ted Sarandos had stated that The Punisher would not debut until 2018 at the earliest, following The Defenders August 18, 2017 release, but in October 2016 Marvel confirmed the 2017 release instead.

In early September 2017, Dominic Patten and Denise Petski of Deadline Hollywood commented on the lack of specific release date for the season at the time, calling it "an unusual" and "rare move for Marvel and Netflix, who usually give a lot of lead-up to the launch" of their high profile series. The pair felt with the increased marketing of the season, it would release "sooner rather than later". Allison Keene of Collider expressed irritation at this because she and other television journalists were unable to plan content without knowing the release date, while fans anticipating the series would watch it "whenever it appears" regardless of when the date is announced. Polygons Susana Polo felt Marvel and Netflix would announce the date at their scheduled New York Comic Con 2017 panel in October, as the convention had been used in previous years to reveal "breaking fall Marvel/Netflix news". It was soon reported that this was indeed the case, with Netflix planning a surprise "drop" release of the season after the New York Comic Con panel, mimicking a strategy from the music industry where an artist's album is released "with little or no fanfare". However, Marvel and Netflix decided to delay the release of the season to later in 2017 following the Las Vegas shooting and subsequent cancelling of the panel. Two weeks later, the November 17 release was announced.

Regarding the decisions made concerning the New York Comic Con panel and the season's release, Loeb said that they were made "specifically because it was a week after a horrible, horrible incident. It hasn't changed the television series, the show is not predominantly about gun violence, and in fact it shows you the problems that occur in that world." Bernthal and Lightfoot felt delaying the release of the season "was the right decision" out of respect for the victims, with Lightfoot saying there was no reason to go ahead with the panel if it was going to upset "even one person involved" with the shooting. Moore had initially felt the season would not be released at all once the panel was cancelled. Between the Las Vegas shooting and subsequent delaying of the season, and the eventual November 17 release, the United States experienced another mass shooting with the Sutherland Springs church shooting. Bernthal hoped that these two shootings and the release of the season would together help further the discussion on gun violence, with "all sides of this debate" represented in The Punisher.

The season, along with the additional Punisher seasons and the other Marvel Netflix series, was removed from Netflix on March 1, 2022, due to Netflix's license for the series ending and Disney regaining the rights. The season became available on Disney+ in the United States, Canada, United Kingdom, Ireland, Australia, and New Zealand on March 16, ahead of its debut in Disney+'s other markets by the end of 2022.

Reception

Critical response
The review aggregator website Rotten Tomatoes reported a 67% approval rating with an average rating of 6.70/10 based on 79 reviews. The site's critical consensus reads, "A rocky start can't keep The Punisher from pushing the boundaries of Marvel's TV universe with a fresh take on the comics-derived action thriller." Metacritic, which uses a weighted average, assigned a score of 55 out of 100, based on 20 critics, indicating "mixed or average reviews". Summarizing the critical response to the entirety of the first season, GameSpot said reviews were "mixed." It received mixed to negative reviews from the LA Times and Salon. 

The Washington Post said that Netflix had finally gotten the franchise "right" in a live-action in a way the prior three movies had failed to please fans. It gave the credit to the "soul" of the show and Bernthal as "one of Marvel's great casting gets" and made the show "a definitive adaptation that doubles as Netflix's best Marvel show to date."   The Hollywood Reporter thought the first 13 episode season felt "at least twice the length it should be." The New York Times said "the action picks up as the season progresses, but The Punisher never quite gets in touch with the visceral roots of its material."

Esquire called the first season "a compelling and complex horror story about the military." The New York Times said that although the action picks up later in the first season, the slow pace made it less pulpy and more of a procedural thriller with a moody and psychological approach, particularly for its focus on PTSD. Variety also wrote positively of both the show and Bernthal's "seamless" performance, saying that "It's difficult to imagine better casting than Bernthal, who communicates so fluently with impassive silences, and is convincing both when he is being terribly violent and especially gentle." However, the review said the show took some time to show that it "transcends what it appears to be" at first, through Steve Lightfoot's "sharp, conscious storytelling." It also praised what it called anti-violence themes throughout the series. Vanity Fair wrote a less positive review, saying the show was as "psychologically confused as its antihero," as the writers had Castle target people for questionable reasons but portrayed him as justified. Vanity Fair wrote that "What the series neglects to examine, of course, is the fact that the Punisher is just as wicked as the villains he targets." Vulture described the show's attempts to "humanize and deepen" Castle beyond the violent "monster" he was in the original comics as "unpersuasive," and described a conflict between the showing wanting to be both The Best Years of Our Lives and Death Wish IV: The Crackdown at the same time.

Lightfoot defended the amount of violence in the series, reiterating that he did not feel that it was any more violent than Daredevil, that he believed it would be worse to not show the violent repercussions of Castle's actions because that would be "flippant" and not convey the real-life cost of the violence, and that Castle never "just blithely walk[s] away" from the violence as it always takes a physical or emotional toll on him. This extended to the repeated depictions of the death of Castle's wife, which Lightfoot did not think was in bad taste because it was about visualizing Castle's feelings, something he would not talk about; the deaths evolve through the season until they show Castle as the one killing her to signify that he blames himself for her death, which Lightfoot felt was important relationship building between Castle and the audience rather than just gratuitous violence.

Accolades
Collider ranked the season as the fourth best among superhero series of 2017.

References

External links
 

2017 American television seasons
01